Edward Clarke may refer to:

 Edward Clarke (MP for Hythe) (died 1628), English MP for Hythe, 1625
 Edward Clarke (of Chipley) (16th–17th century), Member of Parliament for Taunton, Somerset, England
 Edward Clarke (Lord Mayor of London) (died 1703) 
 Edward Clarke (MP for Norwich) (died 1723), English politician, MP for Norwich, 1701–1702
 Edward Clarke (1650–1710), English politician, MP for Taunton, 1690–1710
 Edward Clarke (author) (1730–1786), English cleric
 Edward Daniel Clarke (1769–1822), English naturalist, mineralogist and traveller
 Edward Clarke (1770–1826), British politician, MP for Wootton Bassett, 1796–1802
 Edward Frederick Clarke (1850–1905), Canadian journalist and politician
 Edward Clarke (footballer) (1871–?), English footballer
 Edward Denman Clarke (1898–1966), World War I flying ace
 Edward Hammond Clarke (1820–1877), American physician and author of Sex in Education; or, A Fair Chance for the Girls
 Sir Edward Clarke (barrister) (1841–1931), British lawyer and politician, Solicitor-General for England and Wales, 1886–1892
 Edward Bramwell Clarke (1874–1934), educator in Meiji period Japan
 Edward Clarke (pentathlete) (1888–1982), British modern pentathlete
 Edward Marmaduke Clarke (fl. 1830–1850), Irish scientific instrument maker
 Edward Young Clarke (1877–?), Imperial Wizard pro tempore of the Ku Klux Klan
 Edward H. Clarke (1939–2013), American economist, of Vickrey–Clarke–Groves auction
 Eddie Clarke (musician) (1950–2018), British rock guitarist
 Eddie Clarke (footballer) (born 1998), English footballer

See also
 Edward Clark (disambiguation)
 Edward Clerke, Dean of Cloyne, 1615–1640